Joseph Patrick O'Brien  (born 23 May 1993) is an Irish horse racing trainer  and former flat racing jockey. He is the son of trainer Aidan O'Brien.
In 2012 he rode Camelot to win the 2,000 Guineas, the 2012 Epsom Derby and the Irish Derby.

Riding career
O'Brien won a bronze medal at the 2009 European Pony Championships and was one of three jockeys who shared the Irish champion apprentice jockeys' title in 2010. He rode his first winner on Johann Zoffany, trained by his father, at Leopardstown Racecourse on 28 May 2009 and gained his first classic success when Roderic O'Connor won the 2011 Irish 2,000 Guineas. In 2012 Aidan and Joseph, 19, became the first father-son/trainer-jockey combination to win The Derby, with Camelot.

He was Irish Champion Jockey in 2012 with 87 winners. In October 2013, O'Brien broke a 20-year-old record with a treble at Navan to get his 117th winner of the season and beat the previous record set by Mick Kinane. He finished the 2013 season with 126 winners and retained his Irish Champion Jockey title.

In March 2016 O'Brien announced that he would be stepping down from race-riding to concentrate on his new career as a trainer.

Training career
O'Brien began his training career at Owning Hill, County Kilkenny. He made an immediate impact when Intricately won the Moyglare Stud Stakes in 2016. He went on to win the Melbourne Cup with Rekindling in 2017 and with Twilight Payment in 2020, the Irish Derby with Latrobe in 2018 and the Pretty Polly Stakes with Iridessa in 2019. He also trained several good winners under National Hunt rules.

Major wins as a jockey

 Ireland
 Irish 2,000 Guineas – (3) – Roderic O'Connor (2011), Power (2012), Magician (2013)
 Moyglare Stud Stakes – (1) – Maybe (2011)
 Tattersalls Gold Cup – (1) – So You Think (2012)
 Irish Derby - (2) - Camelot (2012), Australia (2014)
 Irish St. Leger - (1) - Order Of St George (2015)
 Vincent O'Brien National Stakes - (2) - Gleneagles (2014), Air Force Blue (2015)
 Phoenix Stakes - (2) - Dick Whittington (2014),  Air Force Blue (2015)

 France
 Grand Prix de Paris - (1) - Imperial Monarch (2012)

 Great Britain
 2,000 Guineas – (1) – Camelot (2012)
 Ascot Gold Cup - (1) - Leading Light (2014)
 Coronation Cup – (2) – St Nicholas Abbey (2012,2013)
 Derby Stakes – (2) – Camelot (2012), Australia (2014)
 Fillies' Mile - (1) - Together Forever (2014)
 International Stakes - (2) - Declaration of War (2013), Australia (2014)
 Prince of Wales's Stakes - (1) - So You Think (2012)
 Queen Anne Stakes - (1) - Declaration of War (2013)
 Queen Elizabeth II Stakes - (1) - Excelebration (2012)
 Racing Post Trophy – (2) – Camelot (2011), Kingsbarns (2012)
 St. Leger - (1) - Leading Light (2013)

 United Arab Emirates
Dubai Sheema Classic - (1) - St Nicholas Abbey (2013)

 United States
 Breeders' Cup Turf – (1) – St Nicholas Abbey (2011)

Major wins as a trainer
 Ireland
 Irish Derby - (1) - Latrobe (2018)
 Moyglare Stud Stakes – (1) – Intricately (2016)
 National Stakes – (2) – Thunder Moon (2020), Al Riffa (2022)
 Matron Stakes – (1) – Iridessa (2019)
 Pretty Polly Stakes - (2) - Iridessa (2019), Thundering Nights (2021)
 Irish Gold Cup - (1) - Edwulf (2018)
 Racing Post Novice Chase - (1) - Le Richebourg (2018)
 Arkle Novice Chase - (1) - Le Richebourg (2019)
 Golden Cygnet Novice Hurdle - (1) - Tower Bridge (2018)
 Spring Juvenile Hurdle - (2) - Sir Erec (2019), A Wave of the Sea (2020)
 Drinmore Novice Chase - (1) - Fakir D’oudairies (2019)
  Christmas Hurdle - (1) -  Home By The Lee (2022) 

 Australia
 Melbourne Cup – (2) – Rekindling (2017), Twilight Payment (2020)
 Cox Plate - (1) -  State Of Rest (2021) 

 France
 Prix Ganay – (1) –  State Of Rest (2022) 
 Prix Saint-Alary - (1) -  Above The Curve (2022) 

 Great Britain
 Fillies' Mile - (2) - Iridessa (2018), Pretty Gorgeous (2020)
 Prince of Wales's Stakes - (1) - State Of Rest (2022)
 St Leger Stakes - (1) Galileo Chrome (2020)
 Melling Chase - (2) - Fakir D'oudairies (2021, 2022) 
 Ascot Chase - (1) - Fakir D'oudairies (2022) 

 United States
 Breeders' Cup Filly & Mare Turf - (1) - Iridessa (2019)
 Saratoga Derby Invitational Stakes - (1) - State Of Rest (2021)

Year-end charts

See also
List of jockeys

References

External links
Racing Post Profile

Irish jockeys
1993 births
Living people
Irish racehorse trainers